El Comercio may refer to:
 El Comercio (Chile), a newspaper in Chile
 El Comercio (Ecuador), a newspaper in Quito, Ecuador
 El Comercio (Peru), a newspaper in Lima, Peru
 , a newspaper in Manila, Philippines from 1869 to 1926
 El Comercio (Spain), a newspaper in Gijón, Spain
 , a newspaper in Córdoba, Spain from 1875 to 1898
 El Comercio (USA), a newspaper in Woodbridge, Virginia, USA serving the Washington, DC area